Ramban is a town in Ramban district of Jammu and Kashmir, India, which is the district headquarters of Ramban district. It lies on the banks of the Chenab river in Chenab Valley on the National Highway-1A (now NH-44) at about 120 km from Jammu and about 130 km from Srinagar, making it almost the central point on the Jammu-Srinagar National Highway.

History 
C.E. Bats writes in his book, ‘The Gazetteer of Kashmir’, that before the formation of the J&K State in 1846, there was a small village consisting of 15 houses on the right bank of Chenab river known as Nashband (later 'Ramban'). When Raja Gulab Singh of Jammu became the Maharaja of J&K State, he adopted the Jammu-Udhampur-Banihal route to reach Srinagar for the movement of royal caravans. In this process, Ramban received the status of halting station for the royal caravans. The Dogras constructed a pucca building near present Ramban and a wooden bridge for the crossing of Chenab River. Sukhdev Singh Chadak writes in his book Maharaja Ranbir Singh that Maharaja passed an order for a cart road from Jammu to Srinagar via Banihal and a suspension bridge over Chenab River at Ramban. This road became a national highway; it is being converted into four lanes. With the development of this road, the halting station Ramban also developed significantly and now it has got the status of district headquarters.

Geography
Ramban district has an average elevation of 747 metres (3792 feet). The boundary lines of Ramban district have come to be drawn from Patnitop on its south, Assar on its east, Gool on its west and Banihal on its north. Ramban district comprises seven Tehsils, namely Banihal, Khari, Pogal Paristan, Ramban, Rajgarh and Gool, and four community development blocks, namely Banihal, Gool, Ramban and Ramsoo. The district consisted of 116 census villages and 127 Revenue villages in 2001. Total panchayat Halqas in District Ramban are 142.

Demographics

, the Indian census shows Ramban town with a population of 3,596, of which 1,873 are males while 1,723 are females. The literacy rate of Ramban town is 82.23%. In Ramban, male literacy is around 90.42% while female literacy rate is 73.52%.

Villages in Ramban District 
Naik Mohalla

Maitra, Ramban

Jatgali, Ramban

Rajgarh, Ramban

Chanderkote, Ramban (Tanveer Mir Village)
Pernote

Seri

Kanga 

Sharore

Changrog

Karol

Maitra

Attractions

Gajpat Fort
There is an important fort known as Gajpat Fort on the top of the mountain. It is said that once Sheikh Abdullah was kept imprisoned in this fort for several days. In 1825, Gulab Singh imprisoned Raja Sultan Khan of Bimbar in this fort. Sultan Khan died there and was buried at Chanderkote. In 1858 Mean Hathu Singh, the Governor of Rajouri, and close relatives of Maharaja revolted against the state government and tried to kill Maharaja Ranbir Singh. Mean Hathu was arrested and moved to Gajpat fort.

Mosques in Ramban 
Jamma Masjid  is located in Masjid Market Ramban Just Near newly Constructed Flyover
Cafeteria Masjid and Jadeed Jamma Masjid Near Higher Secondary school Ramban 
Other near Mosques are Chandroog Jamma Masjid 
SALAFIA Masjid Maitra

Literacy rate
 Town: 82.23%
 District: 54.27%

Gallery

Transport

Road
Ramban is well-connected by road to other places in Jammu and Kashmir, India by the NH 44.

Rail
Ramban is not connected with railways. The nearest railway station is Banihal Railway Station  located at a distance of 36 kilometres.

Air
The nearest airport is Jammu Airport located at a distance of 124 kilometres.

See also
 Ramban district
 Banihal
 Sangaldan

References

Cities and towns in Ramban district